Carey High School may refer to:

Carey High School (Carey, Idaho), Carey, Idaho
Carey High School (Carey, Ohio), Carey, Ohio
Carey High School (Texas), Carey, Texas
H. Frank Carey Junior-Senior High School, Franklin Square, New York